The SEABA Cup is an international basketball tournament in the International Basketball Federation's Southeast Asia Basketball Association, one of FIBA Asia's subzone. The tournament, which is being held every two years, is the qualifying event for the previously known as FIBA Asia Cup that is now the FIBA Asia Challenge.

Summary

References

 
Basketball competitions in Asia between national teams
2012 establishments in Southeast Asia
Recurring sporting events established in 2012
Biennial sporting events